Martin Turner (born 3 June 1963) is a molecular biologist and Head of the Lymphocyte Signalling & Development Laboratory at the Babraham Institute. His work has helped identify key molecular processes involved in the development of the immune system and its response to pathogens. His work has included research the fundamental mechanisms regulating gene expression by cells of the immune system.

Career

Turner graduated in Biochemistry from University College London and went on to complete a PhD with Professor Sir Marc Feldmann studying the regulation of cytokine gene expression. Subsequently, he joined the MRC National Institute for Medical Research, working with Victor Tybulewicz before joining the Babraham Institute in 1997. Turner became Head of the Lymphocyte Signalling & Development Programme at the Institute in 2005.

Research

During his PhD, Turner contributed to fundamental research that led to the identification of TNF as a potential drug target for the treatment of rheumatoid arthritis.

He went on to work on identifying elements of signal transduction pathways that are needed inside cells to promote proper development of lymphocytes. His work has continued to focus in this area and has included identifying roles for phosphoinositide-3-kinase (PI3K) in lymphocyte development and activation. This work has helped to underpin the development of PI3K delta inhibitors in treating human cancers.

Recent work by his group seeks to understand how RNA-processing mechanisms control the development and function of B and T lymphocytes. In particular, Turner is interested in RNA-binding proteins and microRNAs (particularly miR-155 and how these function within signal transduction networks to control cell differentiation and immunity.

References

External links
 Martin Turner's group at the Babraham Institute

Academics of the University of Cambridge
British molecular biologists
Living people
1963 births
Alumni of University College London
British immunologists